Gliese 3512 is a nearby star in the northern circumpolar constellation of Ursa Major. It is invisible to the naked eye but can be observed using a telescope, having an apparent visual magnitude of +15.05. The star is located at a distance of 31 light-years from the Sun based on parallax. It has a high proper motion, traversing the celestial sphere at the rate of  yr−1. The measurement of the star's radial velocity is poorly constrained, but it appears to be drifting further away at a rate of ~8 km/s.

The stellar classification of Gliese 3512 is dM5.5, which determines this to be a small red dwarf star that is generating energy through core hydrogen fusion. It displays a moderate amount of magnetic activity with a Sun-like cycle lasting 14 years. A low-level variability lasting  matches the approximate rotation period. The star has 12.5% of the mass of the Sun and 16% of the Sun's radius. It is radiating 1.6% of the luminosity of the Sun from its photosphere at an effective temperature of 3,081 K.

Planetary system
A gas giant planet in an eccentric orbit around Gliese 3512 was discovered in 2019 utilizing the radial velocity method. The star's mass is only 250 times that of the gas giant, calling into question traditional models of planetary formation. If the star was born in an open cluster, this planet may instead have formed around a higher-mass star then been swapped into this system during an interaction. The eccentric orbit of this object may have been caused by the ejection of another exoplanet from the system. A second gas giant planet on a wider, circular orbit is suspected; a 2020 study provided stronger evidence for this planet, and it is now considered confirmed by most sources.

See also
 List of star systems within 30–35 light-years

References

External links

M-type main-sequence stars
Planetary systems with two confirmed planets
Ursa Major (constellation)
J08412013+5929505
3512